Christine Conley (born February 4, 1982) is an American politician who has served in the Connecticut House of Representatives from the 40th district since 2017.

References

1982 births
Living people
Democratic Party members of the Connecticut House of Representatives
21st-century American politicians